Monochamus sutor is a species of beetle in the family Cerambycidae. It was described by Carl Linnaeus in 1758, originally under the genus Cerambyx. It has a wide, natural distribution throughout Europe, and has also been introduced into Belgium and the Netherlands.

Subspecies
 Monochamus sutor longulus Pic, 1898
 Monochamus sutor sutor (Linnaeus, 1758)

References

sutor
Beetles described in 1758
Taxa named by Carl Linnaeus